
Gmina Nowa Słupia is a rural gmina (administrative district) in Kielce County, Świętokrzyskie Voivodeship, in south-central Poland.

The gmina contains part of the protected area called Jeleniowska Landscape Park.

Villages
Gmina Nowa Słupia contains the villages and settlements of Bartoszowiny, Baszowice, Cząstków, Dębniak, Dębno, Hucisko, Jeleniów, Jeziorko, Mirocice, Nowa Słupia, Paprocice, Pokrzywianka, Rudki, Serwis, Skały, Sosnówka, Stara Słupia, Trzcianka, Włochy and Wólka Milanowska.

Neighbouring gminas
Gmina Nowa Słupia is bordered by the gminas of Bieliny, Bodzentyn, Łagów, Pawłów and Waśniów.

References

Nowa Slupia
Kielce County